Sunil Caven a/l Chandran (born 27 September 1999) is a Malaysian professional footballer who plays as a winger for Malaysia Super League side Perak.

References

External links
 

Living people
Malaysian footballers
Malaysian people of Indian descent
Association football midfielders
Malaysia Super League players
Petaling Jaya City FC players
Perak F.C. players
Malaysia international footballers
1999 births
Malaysian people of Tamil descent
Malaysian sportspeople of Indian descent